The FIA World Touring Car Cup (abbreviated to WTCR, referring to the use of TCR regulations) was an international touring car championship promoted by Eurosport Events and sanctioned by the Fédération Internationale de l'Automobile (FIA). It has had different incarnation of a World Touring Car Cup held between 1993 and 1995. Following the 2017 season, an agreement was reached for the World Touring Car Championship to become WTCR and use the TCR technical regulations. With titles for drivers and teams only, the WTCR series changed to 'World Cup' rather than 'World Championship' status in 2018.

History

Touring Car World Cup (1993–1995)

In 1993, with the high popularity of the Super Touring category, the FIA hosted the FIA Touring Car World Cup — an annual event for touring car drivers hailing from national championships all over the world. The 1993 race at Monza was won by New Zealand's Paul Radisich, at the wheel of a Ford Mondeo ahead of Nicola Larini's Alfa Romeo 155, with no manufacturer title awarded. The race was run for two more years, (won by Paul Radisich again in 1994 at Donington Park in a Ford Mondeo, manufacturer title went to BMW, and Frank Biela in 1995 at Paul Ricard in an Audi A4 Quattro, and manufacturer title went to Audi). A similar event was planned for 1996 at the A1 Ring, Austria, but was cancelled due to a low number of provisional entries (10 cars). It was never brought back thereafter.

World Touring Car Championship (2005–2017)

World Touring Car Cup (2018–2022)
On 6 December 2017, during the FIA's World Motorsport Council in Paris, it was approved the formation of the new World Touring Car Cup starting from 2018. The new series would utilize the TCR rules, which have been in use in numerous national and international touring car racing series, including the TCR International Series. As a result of the formation of the WTCR, both the WTCC in its current format and the TCR International Series would be discontinued immediately.

A new format was introduced, with one qualifying session and one race on the first day and a three-phase qualifying session on the second day and two races, with the first one having the top 10 of the grid reversed.

In October 2022 it was reported that the series would be folding in its current format following the 2022 season, with any future change to the series being evaluated and announced at a later date.

Issues
The compensation weight system in WTCR – which assigns weight penalties to certain cars for their performance in certain situations – was often criticised, being deemed unnecessary given the series also utilised a Balance of Performance (BoP) system to equalise the performance of the participating cars. As a result of the system, several teams deliberately ordered their drivers to drive slower than possible in qualifying and/or race sessions in order to minimise the compensation weight penalty; often the teams who were best able to game the system had the best chances of success. Another byproduct of the system was a lack of overtaking, as often drivers weren't allowed to go faster to get past other cars when the weight penalties were also calculated from race lap times.

The series was also notorious for the politicking and team orders employed by some teams and their car providers, most notably BRC Racing Team/Hyundai and Cyan Racing/Lynk & Co. The politicking was generally focused on the Balance of Performance, which culminated in Hyundai instructing their customer teams to not participate at the 2020 Race of Germany and Cyan Racing leaving the series halfway through the 2022 season after unsatisfactory BoP.

Rules

Car homologation
Cars had to be production models, with a minimum production of 5000 samples in a year. 
The engine was limited to a displacement of up to 2 liters, turbo charged, and with the aid of restrictors, to a maximum yield of 350 Hp.
Each car was assigned a minimum racing weight which is used to balance the performances.

Scoring system
For the 2022 season, FIA WTCR races were awarded the following points, similar to MotoGP scoring system:

Broadcasters
In 2022, broadcasters of the FIA WTCR included:

 Europe: Eurosport (pan-Europe), Sport1 (Eastern Europe)
 China: Bilibili
 Japan: J Sports
 South Africa: SuperSport
 United States and Canada: Eurosport (Motor Trend), Bein Sports
 Latin America: Directv Sports
 Brazil: DSports
 The Netherlands RTL 7

Cup statistics

Event winners

World Touring Car Cup (2018–2022)

See also
 World Touring Car Championship
 TCR International Series
 List of World Touring Car Cup drivers

References

Sources
 Autosport, January 14, 1988

External links

  

 
TCR Series
Fédération Internationale de l'Automobile
Touring car racing series
Recurring sporting events established in 2018
Recurring sporting events disestablished in 2022